Daniel Gastón Montenegro Casella (born 28 March 1979) is an Argentine former footballer who played mainly as an attacking midfielder.

He spent most of his professional career with Huracán and Independiente, having several spells with both clubs over 21 years. He appeared three times for Argentina, in the 2000s.

Club career
Born in Buenos Aires, Montenegro began his professional career at Club Atlético Huracán in 1997. He subsequently signed for Club Atlético Independiente, going on to represent the club on three different spells and teaming up with sibling Ariel in the first.

In the 1999 January transfer window, Montenegro moved to France with Olympique de Marseille, being loaned several times by the Ligue 1 side for the duration of his contract, mostly to teams in Spain (Real Zaragoza – where he contributed four matches to their conquest of the Copa del Rey – and CA Osasuna, both in La Liga). He then played in quick succession for Independiente and Club Atlético River Plate, before spending parts of two seasons in the Russian Premier League with FC Saturn Ramenskoye.

Montenegro returned to his main club for the 2006–07 season, going on to often act as captain and scoring in double digits in three of his first four years, including a career-best 15 goals in 2008–09. He moved abroad again in 2009, signing with Mexico's Club América for $3.5 million after lengthy negotiations. He made his Liga MX debut for his new team on 2 August, in a 1–2 home loss to Monarcas Morelia. Late in the same month, he scored from his own half in a 7–2 rout of Deportivo Toluca F.C. also at the Estadio Azteca.

On 22 December 2012, free agent Montenegro rejoined Independiente for a fourth spell, agreeing to a one-and-a-half-year contract. In early 2015, he was ousted from the squad after a run-in with manager Jorge Almirón and forced to train alone.

Aged 36, Montenegro returned to Huracán after 13 years having rejected an offer from Club Atlético Nueva Chicago. He remained on the bench for the final of the Supercopa Argentina, won against Club Atlético River Plate shortly after his arrival.

At the end of the 2017–18 campaign, in which he helped the Parque Patricios-based side qualify to the Copa Libertadores after a fourth-place league finish, Montenegro announced his retirement.

International career
Montenegro represented the Argentina under-20 team at the 1999 FIFA World Youth Championship, and made his debut with the full side on 18 April 2007, against Chile. He won the second of his three caps on 1 April 2009, appearing as a late substitute in the Albicelestes 6–1 defeat in Bolivia for the 2010 FIFA World Cup qualifiers.

Personal life
Montenegro's older brother, Ariel, was also a footballer and a midfielder. They shared teams at Independiente, and he spent most of his career in Spain.

HonoursZaragozaCopa del Rey: 2000–01IndependienteArgentine Primera División: Apertura 2002River PlateArgentine Primera División: Clausura 2004Huracán'
Supercopa Argentina: 2014

References

External links

1979 births
Living people
Argentine people of Italian descent
Citizens of Italy through descent
Argentine footballers
Footballers from Buenos Aires
Association football midfielders
Argentine Primera División players
Primera Nacional players
Club Atlético Huracán footballers
Club Atlético Independiente footballers
Club Atlético River Plate footballers
Ligue 1 players
Olympique de Marseille players
La Liga players
Real Zaragoza players
CA Osasuna players
Russian Premier League players
FC Saturn Ramenskoye players
Liga MX players
Club América footballers
Argentina youth international footballers
Argentina under-20 international footballers
Argentina international footballers
Argentine expatriate footballers
Expatriate footballers in France
Expatriate footballers in Spain
Expatriate footballers in Russia
Expatriate footballers in Mexico
Argentine expatriate sportspeople in France
Argentine expatriate sportspeople in Spain
Argentine expatriate sportspeople in Russia
Argentine expatriate sportspeople in Mexico